Law of the Plainsman is a Western television series starring Michael Ansara that aired on NBC from October 1, 1959, until September 22, 1960.

The character of Native American U.S. Marshal Sam Buckhart was introduced in two episodes ("The Indian" and "The Raid") of the popular ABC Western television series The Rifleman starring Chuck Connors. As with The Rifleman, this series was produced by Four Star Productions in association with Levy-Gardner-Laven Productions .

Law of the Plainsman is distinctive in that it was one of the few television programs that featured a Native American as the lead character, a bold move for U.S. network television at that time. Ansara had earlier appeared in the series Broken Arrow, having portrayed the Apache chief, Cochise. Ansara, however, was not Native American but of Lebanese descent.

Plot
Ansara played Sam Buckhart, an Apache Indian who saved the life of a U.S. Cavalry officer after an Indian ambush. When the officer died, he left Sam money that was used for an education at private schools and Harvard University. After school, he returned to New Mexico where he became a deputy marshal working for Marshal Andy Morrison. He lived in a boarding house run by Martha Commager. Other continuing characters include 8-year old Tess Logan, an orphan who had been rescued by Buckhart, and a second Deputy Marshal,  Billy Lordan.

Cast
 Michael Ansara as Deputy Marshal Sam Buckhart

Recurring
 Gina Gillespie as Tess Wilkins (15 episodes)
 Dayton Lummis as Marshal Andy Morrison (9 episodes)
 Nora Marlowe as Martha Commager (7 episodes)
 Robert Harland as Deputy Billy Lordan (7 episodes)
 Wayne Rogers as Deputy Billy Lordan (3 episodes)

Guest cast

Episodes

Production

Filming
The series was produced by Four Star Television and was filmed at CBS Studio Center.

Syndication as The Westerners
The show only lasted one season. For syndicated reruns it was grouped with three other short-lived Western series from the same company, Black Saddle starring Peter Breck, Johnny Ringo starring Don Durant and Sam Peckinpah's critically acclaimed creation, The Westerner starring Brian Keith, under the umbrella title The Westerners, with new introductions and wrap-ups by Keenan Wynn.

References

External links

 
 McNeil, Alex. Total Television  (1996). New York: Penguin Books 
 Brooks, Tim and Marsh, Earle, The Complete Directory to Prime Time Network and Cable TV Shows (1999). New York: Ballantine Books 

1950s Western (genre) television series
NBC original programming
1959 American television series debuts
1960 American television series endings
Television series by 20th Century Fox Television
Television series by Four Star Television
Black-and-white American television shows
United States Marshals Service in fiction
1960s Western (genre) television series
Television shows about Native Americans
Television shows set in New Mexico